is a Japanese free announcer. She was an announcer for TV Asahi. She is represented with Horipro.

Filmography

TV Asahi career

After TV Asahi

Synchronised announcers at TV Asahi
Chie Saburi
Kensuke Sakurai

References

External links
 
Millennium Nyūsha no 3-ri 
 

Japanese announcers
Horipro artists
People from Tokyo
1977 births
Living people
Ferris University alumni